The Magadha-Anga War was a conflict between the Haryanka dynasty of Magadha and the neighbouring Anga Kingdom. The conflict ended in defeat of the Anga kingdom and the Magadha annexed their territory.

War and result
Brahmadatta was older contemporary to Bimbisara of Magadha. He defeated Bhatiya, father of Bimbisara. After assention to the thrown of Magadha Bimbisara  avenged his father's defeat and killed Brahmadatta.The campaign was successful, Anga was annexed, and prince Ajatashatru was appointed governor at Champa.

See also 
 Magadha and Anga
 Avanti-Magadhan Wars
 Magadha-Vajji war

References

History of Bihar
Magadha
Wars involving ancient India
History of India
5th century BC in India
5th-century BC conflicts